Wiley Wiggins (born ) is an American game designer and film actor. A native of Austin, Texas, he is the nephew of Lanny Wiggins, who was a member of Janis Joplin's early band, The Waller Creek Boys.

At the age of 16, Wiggins starred in Richard Linklater's film Dazed and Confused. He later starred in Linklater's Waking Life. He was involved in early 1990s cyberculture and wrote occasionally for such magazines as FringeWare Review, Mondo 2000, and Boing Boing.

Filmography
Dazed and Confused (1993) as Mitch Kramer
Love and a .45 (1994) as Young Store Clerk
Boys (1996) as John Phillips
Plastic Utopia (1997) as Jogger Joe
The Faculty (1998) as F‘%# Up #2
Waking Life (2001) as Main Character; also one of the animators
Frontier (2001) as Soldier
Goliath (2008) as Alvin
Sorry, Thanks (2009) as Max Callahan
Computer Chess (2013) as Martin Beuscher
Social Animals (2018)

Production roles
Editor: The Outlaw Son (2007)
Producer: Frontier (2001) (co-producer)
Self: The Art Show (2004)

References

External links
Wiley Wiggins's blog
Interview with Wiley Wiggins in Scene Missing magazine

Living people
American bloggers
American video game designers
Male actors from Austin, Texas
20th-century American male actors
21st-century American male actors
American male bloggers
American male child actors
Year of birth missing (living people)